KCLD-FM (104.7 MHz) is an American radio station in St. Cloud, Minnesota, airing a CHR/Top 40 music format. The station is owned by Leighton Broadcasting. It has been a Top 40 outlet since 1976.

The current on-air weekday lineup includes KCLD Playhouse Mornings with Kat and JJ Holiday, Alayna Jaye on mid-days, Derek Lee on afternoons and the live syndicated Liveline with Mason Kelter at night.

Former on-air staff
Former morning hosts include Zach Pizza (2007–2008), Keri Kramer, Chris Pickett (March 2004—August 2005), Pat Ebertz, Barry Collins, Shawnda McNeal (March 2004-August 2005, now at WSTO), Rich Ward, Julie K (1995), Stevo Hunter, and John Uran.

Former mid-day personalities include Taylor Shay (now at WIAD, Washington, D.C.), Chase (now at WZEE), Cathy Cooley, Patty McLain, Cheryl West, Neal Thelen, Blake Patton, Jack Hicks, Sam Stevens and Famous Amos (now on Lite 99.9 as the morning host).

Former afternoon hosts include Mike Shaffer (2008–2010, now at WSTW), Brook Stephans (now at KZPK), Blaine Fowler (now at WDVD-Detroit), Timmy Daniels (2005-2008), John E. Cage, Hurricane Keith Carr, and Tom Wakefield.

Former evening hosts include Wayne D (now at WSIX-FM), Wes McKane, Lackey Boy (98-99, now known as "Chris Parker" at WTVR-Richmond), David Black (January 1998-?), Dave Kelly (2000-2002), Dino (2002–2004, now at WFBC-FM), Mike Danger (now at WPXY), John Nordstrom (1992), Chad Brueske, Susan Sheffield, Earl Wayne, Mike Boelter, and Darrin Feist.

History
The 104.7 MHz frequency in St. Cloud was originally assigned to KFAM-FM, which was owned by the St. Cloud Daily Times. A sister station of AM station KFAM, KFAM-FM began broadcasting in 1948.

KFAM-FM was sold for $400,000 in 1975. The new owner, Alvar Leighton, changed the call letters to KCLD.

References

External links
104.7 KCLD official website

Radio stations in St. Cloud, Minnesota
Contemporary hit radio stations in the United States
Radio stations established in 1977
1976 establishments in Minnesota